Miquel Adlert i Noguerol (1911 in Paterna, l’Horta de Valencia, Spain - 1989) was a Valencian novelist and publisher.

He was one of the main instigators of the literary renaissance in Valencia (Valencia area of Spain) during the 1940s. In 1943, he co-founded with Xavier Casp the publishing house l’Editorial Torre, which published the best-known Valencian writers of the post-war era.

En 1935 was member of the valencian nacionalist political party Accio Nacionalista Valenciana. After the Spanish Civil War, the party could't be legalised, and all his efforts were driven throw literature.

In 1953, his novel I la pau ("And the Peace") and his novella El salze à la sendera ("One on the Path"), both with characteristic features of the Catholic novel, were published. His short story collection Cor al nu was published in 1956.

When democracy was restored, he participated co-founding the magazine Murta, who was the most important media of the blaverist movement.

Publications
 I la pau (1953) 
 El salze a la sendera (1953) 
 Cor al nu (1956)
 En defensa de la llengua valenciana (1977)
 De la meua catacumba (1984)
 El compromís de Casp, qüestió juridica (1984)
 Del periodisme meu (1984)

References
 Diccionari de la Literatura Catalana, 2008

1911 births
1989 deaths
Writers from the Valencian Community
Spanish publishers (people)
Catalan-language writers